Bruske may refer to:

 Jim Bruske (born 1964), American baseball player
 Paul H. Bruske (1877–1956), American writer, journalist, advertising executive, and sportsman